Kamlesh D. Patel (born 1956) also known as Daaji among his followers, is a spiritual leader, author and the fourth in the line of Rāja yoga masters in the Sahaj Marg system of spiritual practice. He has been the president of Shri Ram Chandra Mission, a non-profit organization founded in 1945 and associated with the United Nations Department of Public Information, since 2014.

He regularly conducts workshops and he has written two books on the topics of meditation and spirituality.

Early life

Patel was born in Gujarat in 1956. He trained as a pharmacist in Ahmedabad, and as a pharmacy student he started practicing the Sahaj Marg system of Raja Yoga meditation in 1976 under the guidance of Ram Chandra of Shahjahanpur.

Professional life

He moved to New York City after graduating with honours from L M College of pharmacy, Ahmedabad. He lived in the US with his wife and raised two sons. He did his post graduate degree and built a pharmaceutical business in New York. Since 2003 he has mainly been working for the Shri Ram Chandra Mission.

Sahaj Marg

Patel started practicing Sahaj Marg meditation in 1976, when he was a pharmacology student, under the guidance of a trainer. He subsequently received training from Ram Chandra. After Ram Chandra’s death in 1983, Patel worked with Parthasarathi Rajagopalachari (Chariji), the second president of Shri Ram Chandra Mission, holding a number of responsibilities in the organization. In October 2011, he was nominated as Chariji’s successor, and after Chariji’s death in December 2014, he became the spiritual guide and the third President of Shri Ram Chandra Mission. He has conducted various workshops on spirituality in cities across India and the USA.

Awards and recognition

Books
Patel co-authored a book called The Heartfulness Way with Joshua Pollock in 2018. In February 2018, the book was among the top 10 best selling non fiction books in Hindustan Times' Nielsen chart.

His book Designing Destiny was released in February 2019.

He also wrote a book named 'The Wisdom Bridge' which was released in 2022.

References

External links 
 Official website

1956 births
Living people
New Age spiritual leaders
Indian spiritual teachers
Indian spiritual writers
People from Gujarat
Recipients of the Padma Bhushan in other fields